Manoel de Aguiar Fagundes (22 August 1907 – 22 November 1953) is a former Brazilian football player.

References

1907 births
1953 deaths
Brazilian footballers
1930 FIFA World Cup players
Goytacaz Futebol Clube players
Canto do Rio Football Club players
Association football forwards
Sportspeople from Niterói